Salvia funckii is a perennial shrub native to Colombia, growing on rocky slopes in cloud forest from  elevation.

Notes

External links
International Plant Names Index

funckii
Flora of Colombia